Alec Michael Burleson (born November 25, 1998) is an American professional baseball outfielder and first baseman for the St. Louis Cardinals of Major League Baseball (MLB).

Amateur career
Burleson attended East Lincoln High School in Denver, North Carolina. As a junior in 2016, he hit .390 with six home runs alongside pitching to a 0.83 ERA. In 2017, his senior year, he batted .429 with three home runs, nine doubles and 23 RBIs and was named the Southern District 7 2A Offensive Player of the Year. He went undrafted in the 2017 Major League Baseball draft, and enrolled at East Carolina University where he played college baseball.

As a freshman at East Carolina in 2018, Burleson batted .252 with 18 RBIs over 36 games and 103 at-bats alongside pitching 54 innings, going 5–2 with a 3.33 ERA and four saves. He was named the American Athletic Conference Rookie Pitcher of the Year. That summer, he played in the Cal Ripken Collegiate Baseball League for the Bethesda Big Train. In 2019, his sophomore season, he hit .370 with nine home runs and 61 RBIs, and pitched to a 6–2 record and 3.28 ERA over  innings. He was named to the AAC First Team as an outfielder, and to the Second Team as a utility player. Over the summer, he played for the USA Baseball Collegiate National Team and also made a brief appearance in the Cape Cod Baseball League with the Bourne Braves. In 2020, his junior season, Burleson hit .375 with three home runs and 12 RBIs over 17 games, alongside pitching to a 4.24 ERA over four starts, before the college baseball season was cut short due to the COVID-19 pandemic. Over his collegiate career, Burleson started games at first base, left field, right field, designated hitter, and as a pitcher.

Professional career
After the season, Burleson was selected by the St. Louis Cardinals as an outfielder in the second round (70th overall) of the 2020 Major League Baseball draft. He signed for $700,000. He did not play a minor league game in 2020 because the season was cancelled. To begin the 2021 season, he was assigned to the Peoria Chiefs of the High-A Central. He was quickly promoted to the Springfield Cardinals of the Double-A Central, and was then promoted to the Memphis Redbirds of the Triple-A East in early August. Burleson ended the 2021 season with a combined .270/.329/.454 slash line with 22 home runs and 76 RBIs over 119 games between the three clubs.

Burleson returned to Memphis to begin the 2022 season. Over 109 games, he slashed .331/.372/.532 with twenty home runs, 87 RBIs, and 25 doubles.

On September 6, 2022, the Cardinals selected Burleson's contract and promoted him to the major leagues. He made his MLB debut on September 8 as the club's starting right fielder, going hitless over four at-bats with a walk in an 11–6 loss to the Washington Nationals. He collected his first MLB hit on September 11, a single off Duane Underwood Jr. of the Pittsburgh Pirates in a 4-3 St. Louis win. He hit his first MLB home run on September 23 off of Hanser Alberto of the Los Angeles Dodgers at Dodger Stadium in an 11-0 Cardinals win. Over 48 at-bats in 16 games with the Cardinals, he hit .188 with one home run, three RBIs, and one double.

References

External links

1998 births
Living people
Baseball players from Charlotte, North Carolina
Major League Baseball outfielders
St. Louis Cardinals players
East Carolina Pirates baseball players
Bethesda Big Train players
Bourne Braves players
Peoria Chiefs players
Springfield Cardinals players
Memphis Redbirds players